Hleb Aliaksandravich Dudarau (born October 17, 1996) is a Belarusian hammer thrower.  He represented his home country at the 2018 European Athletics Championships, finishing a meter out of qualifying for the final.  His personal best , set just three and a half months earlier, would have been the number one qualifier or a bronze medal behind the Polish duo of Wojciech Nowicki and Paweł Fajdek.

Already an outstanding junior hammer thrower, he holds the national junior record in both the hammer throw and weight throw in his home country.  Belarus has a strong tradition in hammer throw, winning 4 Olympic medals in the 6 Olympics of its existence.  Prior to that, as part of the Soviet Union, Belorussian athletes added an additional 6 medals.  Hleb came to the US to throw for the University of Kansas using the name Gleb Dudarev.  He was the runner-up at the 2019 NCAA Championships.

References

External links
 

1996 births
Living people
Belarusian male hammer throwers
Kansas Jayhawks men's track and field athletes
Athletes (track and field) at the 2020 Summer Olympics
Olympic athletes of Belarus